The Municipality of Žetale is a municipality in eastern Slovenia, on the border with Croatia. Its seat is the village of Žetale. The area is part of the traditional region of Styria. The municipality is now included in the Drava Statistical Region.

Flag and Coat of Arms
The flag and coat of arms of Žetale are a principally green and yellow design, featuring sweet chestnut leaves and fruit. Above it on the coat of arms is a castle embattlement upon which stands the flaming sword and scales of the Archangel Michael.

Geography
It consists of the villages of Žetale, Čermožiše, Dobrina, Kočice, and Nadole, with a total population of 1,364.

Nearby attractions
The Jože of Žetale Hiking Trail with a precipice on the north side leads from Žetale to Donačka Gora, passing Resenik Hill and Medgorje to the eastern third peak. The views available include the forested slopes of Mount Macelj, Resenik Hill, Žetale, the vineyards of Haloze, and the church of Mary Help of Christians.

Churches
The Žetale Valley has a number of churches. Saint Sebastian's Church, dating to 1415, was built in memory of victims of the plague. Nearby is the pilgrimage Church of Mary Help of Christians from 1725. Archangel Michael's Church from 1426 stands in Žetale.

References

External links
 
 Žetale municipal site
 Municipality of Žetale at Geopedia

Žetale
1998 establishments in Slovenia